Wong Shuk Fan (born 29 April 1980) is a Hongkonger footballer who plays as a midfielder. She is also a futsal player, and represented Hong Kong internationally in both football and futsal.

International career 
Wong Shuk Fan has been capped for Hong Kong at senior level in both football and futsal. In football, she represented Hong Kong at two AFC Women's Asian Cup qualifications (2010 and 2014) and two AFC Women's Olympic Qualifying Tournament editions (2012 and 2020).

In futsal, Wong Shuk Fan played for Hong Kong at two AFC Women's Futsal Championship editions (2015 and 2018).

International goals

See also 
 List of Hong Kong women's international footballers

References 

1980 births
Living people
Hong Kong women's footballers
Women's association football midfielders
Hong Kong women's international footballers
Hong Kong women's futsal players